Neither Fish nor Flesh (A Soundtrack of Love, Faith, Hope & Destruction) is the second album by American singer Terence Trent D'Arby, released in 1989 on Columbia Records. A follow-up to his debut Introducing the Hardline, the album was a commercial disappointment, spending only four weeks on the UK Albums Chart, and was largely dismissed by critics as self-indulgent and overreaching.

Reception 
In a review of Neither Fish nor Flesh for The Village Voice, Robert Christgau said despite D'Arby's pretensions and awful lyrics on some songs, the psychedelic pop record's music "proves D'Arby a master of the black spectrum from the trad R&B of 'I'll Be Alright' to the reconstructed Prince-funk of 'This Side of Love'". Andrew Martin, reviewer of British music newspaper Music Week, chose it as "Album of the Week" and called it "as a complete work, a masterpiece". He concludes: "D'Arby's wit, verve and self-professed genius remains intact." Rolling Stone critic Mark Coleman said D'Arby's effort "fails to establish him as a visionary pop godhead. It does, however, demonstrate convincingly that he's far more than a mere legend in his own mind." AllMusic's Tom Demalon retrospectively called it "a sprawling, overly ambitious work that incorporates Middle Eastern flavorings and even more of a gospel influence into his gritty mix of rock, R&B, and funk", although he felt D'Arby's "pretensions run a bit wild".

On the album commentary on his website, D'Arby (now known as Sananda Maitreya) claimed that the album's lack of commercial impact was due to his record company's "wholesale rejection of it" as well as being hindered by German record producer Frank Farian who decided to release an album of D'Arby's performances with funk band The Touch (from 1984) in Germany just weeks before Neither Fish Nor Flesh was due for release. Maitreya states that Neither Fish Nor Flesh was "the project that literally killed 'TTD', and from whose molten ashes, began the life of Sananda".

Track listing 
All songs written and arranged by Terence Trent D'Arby.
 "Declaration: Neither Fish Nor Flesh" – 1:44
 "I Have Faith in These Desolate Times" – 4:14
 "It Feels So Good to Love Someone Like You" – 3:38
 "To Know Someone Deeply Is to Know Someone Softly" – 4:27
 "I'll Be Alright" – 5:57
 "Billy Don't Fall" – 4:21
 "This Side of Love" – 4:59
 "Attracted to You" – 4:01
 "Roly Poly" – 3:54
 "You Will Pay Tomorrow" – 4:54
 "I Don't Want to Bring Your Gods Down" – 6:19
 "...And I Need to Be with Someone Tonight" – 3:04

Personnel 
 Terence Trent D'Arby (aka the Incredible E.G. O'Reilly, aka Ecneret Tnert Ybra'D) – vocals, kazoo (track 10), Fender Rhodes piano (tracks 9 and 11), sitar (track 3), scratching (track 3), keyboards (tracks 3, 4, 7–9), clavinet (tracks 6, 8 and 10), timpani (track 3), guitar (tracks 1, 2, 6–8), drums (tracks 4, 6–9, 11), cymbal (track 3), percussion (tracks 2–6, 8–10 and 12), tambourine (tracks 8, 10 and 11), piano (tracks 4, 7 and 9), organ (tracks 3 and 9), vibraphone (track 4), handclaps (track 5), marimba (track 9), arrangements
 Michael Timothy – bass guitar (track 4), piano (tracks 8, 9 and 11), Hammond organ (tracks 4, 8 and 11), Fender Rhodes (track 5), recorder (track 9), score

with:
 Richard Addison - clarinet (track 9)
 Bob Andrews - Hammond organ (track 5)
 Jack Bayle - trombone (track 11)
 Conor Brady - guitar (tracks 4, 6 and 11)
 Bob Brimson - guitar (track 1)
 Richie Buckley - tenor saxophone (track 8)
 Roger Chase - viola (track 10)
 Simon Clarke - alto saxophone (track 5)
 Ben Cruft - violin (track 10)
 John Curran - saxophone (track 11)
 Helen Davies - koto water harp (track 2)
 Antonio Drennan - guitar (track 1)
 Geoff Dunn - drums (track 5 and 10)
 David Emanuel - viola (tracks 7 and 9)
 Carl Geraghty - saxophone (track 11)
 Wilfred Gibson - violin (tracks 7 and 9)
 Pete Glenister - guitar (tracks 7–10)
 John Heley - cello (track 7)
 David Maldwyn James - cello (track 3)
 Michael Jeans - oboe (track 9)
 Cass Lewis - bass guitar (tracks 5, 9 and 10)
 Roddy Lorimer - trumpet (tracks 5 and 10)
 Martin Loveday - cello (tracks 9 and 10)
 Christian Marsac - guitar (track 5), saxophone (track 7)
 Neil Martin - viola (tracks 3 and 11)
 Stephen McDonnell - trumpet (track 11)
 Tony Malloy - bass guitar (track 8)
 Padraig O'Connor - viola (tracks 3 and 11)
 Eoghan O'Neill - bass guitar (tracks 6, 7 and 11)
 Dick Pearce - trumpet (track 9)
 Percy Robinson - pedal steel guitar (track 3)
 Tim Sanders - tenor saxophone (tracks 5 and 10)
 Geoff Scantlebury - sparkle sticks (track 10)
 Alan Smale - violin (tracks 3 and 11)
 Katherine Smale - violin (tracks 3 and 11)
 Paul Spong - trumpet (tracks 5 and 10)
 Chris Wellington - viola (track 7)
 David White - clarinet (track 9)
 Pete Wingfield - piano (track 5)
 Gavyn Wright - violin (tracks 7, 9 and 10)

Alan Smale and Katherine Smale appear as The Degani Ensemble, while Simon Clarke, Roddy Lorimer, Paul Spong and Tim Sanders appear as the Kick Horns.

Charts

Sales and certifications

References

External links 
 Sananda Maitreya's official site

1989 albums
Terence Trent D'Arby albums
Columbia Records albums
Psychedelic pop albums